Ungureni is a commune in Botoșani County, Western Moldavia, Romania. It is composed of twelve villages: Borzești, Călugăreni (also Călugărenii Vechi), Călugărenii Noi, Durnești, Epureni, Mihai Viteazu, Mândrești, Plopenii Mari, Plopenii Mici, Tăutești, Ungureni and Vicoleni.

References

Communes in Botoșani County
Localities in Western Moldavia